The podcast The Complete Guide to Everything (TCGTE) released its first episode on July 2, 2009. The show is hosted by Tom Reynolds and Tim Daniels, and releases episodes weekly on Sundays.

Episode list

Pre-audio, video podcasts:

Live shows
The first-ever live versions of the show, hosted by Reynolds and Daniels, took place in London, England on 7–8 May 2011, and were held at the Hen and Chickens Theatre and Kings Place respectively. Tickets for the event sold out. A short 5-minute video of the first live show was released in lieu of the full recording of the show, which was lost during 'the London Incident' (see below).

Additionally, the show has done one live aftershow following the 1990s Sitcoms: TGIF edition that appeared on UStream.tv. The aftershow took place at a bar and was released on the UStream.tv iPhone application.

After Dark Episode List
For a short period of time, The Complete Guide to Everything had a premium subscription service in which listeners would pay a monthly fee to hear an extra podcast throughout the month. The "After Dark" episodes included interviews of people that the hosts knew. Eventually, Reynolds and Daniels decided to discontinue to the premium subscription, and all episodes became available to purchase at TCGTE online store.

References 

Complete Guide to Everything